Islamia Government College is a government owned college in Sirajganj, Bangladesh.

References 

Colleges in Sirajganj District
Education in Sirajgonj
Sirajganj Sadar Upazila